The Himalayan bent-toed gecko (Cyrtopodion himalayanus) is a species of gecko found in northern India (Jammu and Kashmir) and western Nepal. It is sometimes placed in the genus Cyrtopodion.

References
 Duda P L; Sahi D N 1978 Cyrtodactylus himalayanus: a new gekkonid species from Jammu, India. Journal of Herpetology 12 (3) 1978: 351-354
 Kluge A G 1993 Gekkonoid Lizard Taxonomy. International Gecko Society, San Diego, 245 pp.
 Rösler, H. 2000 Kommentierte Liste der rezent, subrezent und fossil bekannten Geckotaxa (Reptilia: Gekkonomorpha). Gekkota 2: 28-153
 

Fauna of Pakistan
Cyrtodactylus
Reptiles described in 1978